Yated Ne'eman refers to

Yated Ne'eman (Israel), an Israeli newspaper published in Hebrew
Yated Ne'eman (United States), an American newspaper published in English

See also
Yated (moshav)
 Ne'eman (disambiguation)

Hebrew words and phrases